Sandie Rose Toletti (born 13 July 1995) is a French professional footballer who plays as a midfielder for Spanish Primera División club Real Madrid CF and the France national team.

Career
A playmaking midfielder, Toletti joined Montpellier in 2010 and broke into the first team in 2013.

With the French under-17 team, Toletti played in the 2012 UEFA Women's Under-17 Championship and was named UEFA's Golden Player after France lost a penalty shootout in the final to Germany.
She won FIFA U17 Women's World Championship with France later this year, defeating North Korea in the final after penalty shootout.

At the 2013 UEFA Women's Under-19 Championship, Toletti was UEFA's Golden Player again. In the final she scored France's first goal in their 2–0 extra time win over England.

In October 2013 she made her senior France debut in a 6–0 win over Poland.

Career statistics

International

Scores and results list France's goal tally first, score column indicates score after each Toletti goal.

Honours
France U19
UEFA Women's Under-19 Championship: 2013

France U17
FIFA U-17 Women's World Cup: 2012

Individual
UEFA Women's Under-17 Championship: Golden Player 2012
UEFA Women's Under-19 Championship: Golden Player 2013

References

External links
 
 Profile at Montpellier HSC 
 
 
 
 Player French football stats  at footofeminin.fr

1995 births
Living people
People from Bagnols-sur-Cèze
Sportspeople from Gard
Footballers from Occitania (administrative region)
French women's footballers
Women's association football midfielders
Montpellier HSC (women) players
Levante UD Femenino players
Real Madrid Femenino players
Division 1 Féminine players
Primera División (women) players
France women's youth international footballers
France women's international footballers
UEFA Women's Euro 2022 players
French expatriate women's footballers
French expatriate sportspeople in Spain
Expatriate women's footballers in Spain
French sportspeople of Italian descent
UEFA Women's Euro 2017 players